Club Sportif Vittellois was a football club based in Vittel, France. It was founded in 1935, and ceased to exist in 2015 after a merger with Contrex FC and JS Bulgnéville, creating Bulgnéville Contrex Vittel FC.

History 
Club Sportif Vittellois was founded in 1935. The club played in the Division 2 in the 1973–74 season, the highest tier they reached in the French football pyramid. However, the team finished last in their group, synonymous with relegation to the Division 3. In 1977, the club was relegated from the Division 3, falling to the Division d'Honneur. Vittel would never play at a national level again.

In 2015, CS Vittel merged with Contrex FC and JS Bulgnéville to create Bulgnéville Contrex Vittel FC.

Managerial history 

 1961–1962:  Antoine Jurilli
 1974–1975:  
 1979–1984:  Jean Deloffre

Honours

References 

Defunct football clubs in France
Association football clubs established in 1935
1935 establishments in France
Association football clubs disestablished in 2015
2015 disestablishments in France
Sport in Vosges (department)